Richard Thomas Coleman (born c. 1956) is a Canadian politician and former police officer, who served as a Member of the Legislative Assembly in British Columbia from 1996 to 2020, and is a former interim leader of the British Columbia Liberal Party. He was first elected in 1996 and re-elected in 2001, 2005, 2009, 2013 and 2017. Coleman represented the riding of Langley East.

Early life
Coleman was born in Nelson before the family moved to Penticton in 1957 where he graduated from Penticton Secondary School in 1971. His father was a civil servant and his mother Rosa Coleman was a school English teacher. He has five siblings and is married to Michele Coleman.

Before entering politics, Coleman was member of the RCMP and ran a real estate management business.

Cabinet and leadership positions
In January 2007, as BC Forests and Range Minister, at the request of Western Forest Products, Rich Coleman approved the removal of 28,283 hectares (approx. 70,000 acres) of private land from three coastal tree farm licences along the south-west coast of Vancouver Island and transferred ownership of these lands in totality to Western Forest Products. Minister Coleman announced this decision about eight months after his brother, Stan Coleman, joined Western Forest Products as their manager of strategic planning.

In response to the many concerns and allegations of this land giveaway, the University of Victoria's Environmental Law Centre requested an official investigation by the Auditor-General's Office of British Columbia. On July 1, 2008, BC Auditor-General John Doyle released his report, "Removing Private Land from Tree Farm Licences 6, 19 & 25: Protecting the Public Interest?" In his report he "condemned former forests minister Rich Coleman for allowing a forestry company to remove land from three tree farm licences for residential development, citing the possibilities of conflicts of interest and insider trading by government staff."

Rich Coleman was the interim leader of the British Columbia Liberal Party and Leader of the Opposition in the British Columbia Legislative Assembly, from August 4, 2017 to February 3, 2018.

From 2012 to 2017 he was Deputy Premier and served variously as Minister of Natural Gas Development, Minister Responsible for Housing.

Coleman served as Chair of the Cabinet Working Group on Mental Health, Vice Chair of the Cabinet Priorities and Planning Committee and was a member of the Cabinet Committees on Jobs and Economic Growth and Environment and Land Use. Coleman was also Government House Leader. He previously served as Minister of Public Safety and Solicitor General, Minister of Forests and Range, Minister Responsible for Housing, Minister of Public Safety and Solicitor General and Minister of Housing and Social Development.

As Minister of Housing and Social Development, Rich Coleman presided over those years when offshore foreign investment in BC real estate was a growing public concern, amidst a growing housing crisis. As late as July 2015, Rich Coleman refused to comply with repeated requests for relevant data and analysis: “We’ve worked with the real estate guys for years and have got data on sales,” Coleman said. Asked twice why not at least share the data, he redirected the topic to dangers of restricting foreign investment, claiming that “throws an ethnic group out there and says they’re the problem.” By August 2016, with a year leading up to the next provincial election (May 2017), "the B.C. government moved so quickly to institute its new tax on foreign buyers that it never finished a promised study into the impact of foreign ownership on housing affordability."

From 1996 to 2001, Coleman served as opposition housing critic, forests deputy critic, and caucus whip, and was a member of the Official Opposition Caucus Committee on Crime.

Coleman was the minister responsible for the April 2009 shutdown of an RCMP task force on illegal gambling, three months after it warned that organized crime was involved in both legal and illegal gaming activities in BC. Internal government records were later released suggesting that the task force was disbanded due to "funding pressure ... and perceived ineffectiveness." Coleman has said that the team was shut down because "it wasn't effective." In early 2020 new revelations came to light regarding the extent and criminality of this episode of money laundering in BC. Rich Coleman "was repeatedly asked to respond in an interview to the allegations in this story" but refused, agreeing by statement only to cooperate with any future inquiry.

On December 1, 2010, Coleman announced to the media he had decided not to enter the provincial Liberal leadership race to replace retiring BC Premier Gordon Campbell. Coleman indicated he had planned to announce his run on Thursday, had MLA support and campaign funds, but decided not to pursue the post due to family reasons. He was considered a frontrunner to replace Gordon Campbell.

Coleman is considered one of the best fundraisers and organizers for the BC Liberals.

In February 2019, Coleman announced that he would not seek re-election in the next provincial election.

In June 2022 the Cullen Commission of Inquiry into Money Laundering in British Columbia final report stated:"By 2010, then-minister responsible for gaming Rich Coleman was aware of the concerns of the GPEB investigation division and law enforcement that the province’s casinos were being used to launder the proceeds of crime... more could have been done by Mr. Coleman... who served in that role for extended periods during the evolution of this crisis.

A poll conducted by Research Co. in June 2022 found that 66% of British Columbians believed it is true that Coleman knowingly ignored warnings about suspected drug-money laundering in casinos.

Coleman ran for mayor of Langley Township in 2022, finishing a distant third.

Honours
Coleman received the Queen's Golden Jubilee Medal in 2003.

He was awarded the Canada 125 Medal for community service.

Coleman was the 1988 Langley, British Columbia Volunteer of the Year

Coleman was awarded Rotary's top honour the Paul Harris Fellowship

Coleman was the second person ever awarded Kin Canada (Kinsmen)'s highest honour, the Hal Rogers Fellowship, after Kin founder Harold A. Rogers.

See also
Executive Council of British Columbia

Electoral record

References

External links
Rich Coleman, MLA for Fort Langley-Aldergrove

1956 births
Living people
British Columbia Liberal Party MLAs
Deputy premiers of British Columbia
Members of the Executive Council of British Columbia
People from Penticton
Royal Canadian Mounted Police officers
21st-century Canadian politicians
Solicitors general of Canadian provinces